Enloe is an unincorporated community in Delta County, Texas, United States. Enloe has a post office with the ZIP code 75441.

References

External links
 

Unincorporated communities in Delta County, Texas
Unincorporated communities in Texas
Dallas–Fort Worth metroplex